The Monastery of Sendomir is a 1920 Swedish drama film directed by Victor Sjöström, based on an 1828 short story by Franz Grillparzer. It has also been released in the UK as The Secret of the Monastery. A German adaptation of the story The Monastery of Sendomir, directed by Rudolf Meinert, had been released the previous year.

Plot
The main part of the film is told in a flashback by a monk to two visiting noblemen on their way to Warsaw in the 17th century. He tells them how a mighty count named Starschensky once ruled Sendomir (Sandomierz), but after an intrigue in which his wife was unfaithful with her own cousin he had to use all his resources to build the monastery where they are now staying. At the end it is revealed that the monk is in fact Starschensky himself.

Cast
 Tore Svennberg as Count Starschensky
 Tora Teje as Elga
 Richard Lund as Oginsky
 Renée Björling as Dortka
 Albrecht Schmidt as Manager
 Gun Robertson as Starschensky's Daughter
 Erik A. Petschler as Nobleman
 Nils Tillberg as Nobleman
 Gustaf Ranft as Abbot
 Yngwe Nyquist as Servant
 Axel Nilsson as Friar
 Jenny Tschernichin-Larsson as Coal Miner's Wife
 Emil Fjellström as Friar

See also
Confessions of a Monk (1922)

References

External links

The Monastery of Sendomir available for free download at Internet Archive

1920 films
1920 drama films
Swedish drama films
Swedish silent films
Swedish black-and-white films
Films directed by Victor Sjöström
Films based on short fiction
Films set in the 17th century
Films set in Poland
Films based on works by Franz Grillparzer
1920s Swedish-language films
Silent drama films
1920s Swedish films